Vitaliy Borysovyvch Antonov (born December 12, 1962, in Stryi, Lviv Oblast) is an entrepreneur from Western Ukraine the founder of OKKO Group.

Education
Antonov studied at Stryi School Number 4 from 1970 to 1978. In 1988 he graduated from Ternopil National Economic University with honors with a specialization in “Finance and Credit”. He defended a dissertation on the topic “Activation of the Attraction of Foreign Direct investment into Ukraine's Economy in the Condition of Global Competition” and received a scientific degree, a Ph.D. in economics in 2011.

Career
Antonov is an Honorary General Consul of the Republic of Lithuania in Lviv and he holds a Ph.D. in Economics.

In 1988–1990 Antonov was the head of the mountaineering and tourist club in his hometown; in 1990–1992 he worked as the head of the Lviv Regional Rescue Service of the Red Cross Society in Stryi.

In 1992, Antonov started his own business. He became the director of the private company Karat, which carried out wholesale trade in various groups of goods. Soon one of his main specializations was the trade in petroleum products. In 1995, Vitaliy Antonov became the President of OJSC Galnaftogaz, in 2001-2021 the head of the supervisory board of OJSC Concern Galnaftogaz.

In 1999, Antonov opened the first filling station under the OKKO brand in Stryi. In 2000, the first large OKKO filling station complex with a shop, cafe and portal car wash was opened in Lviv on Zelena Street - a prototype of the modern format of filling stations in the OKKO network.

From 2004 to 2009, Antonov was the president of the Universalna Investment Group.

From 2006 to 2021, he has been a member of the supervisory board of Concern Khlibprom.

From 2008 to 2019 - head of the supervisory board of insurance company "Universalna".

In 2010–2012, Antonov was recognized three times in a row as the best among the heads of oil and gas companies in the Top-100 ranking of the best managers in Ukraine, compiled by InvestGazeta and Ekonomika publications. At the same time, in 2011 he was among the top three best managers in Ukraine, and in 2012 he was recognized as the best manager in the category "Seller and Marketer" - according to the above-mentioned edition "Top-100".

According to the results of online voting on the portal of the newspaper Delo in 2012, Antonov took third place in the national rating "Responsible Leader".

In 2013, he entered the hundred most influential people in the country for the first time, according to the Correspondent magazine, taking 66th place in this list.

In 2014, the President of PJSC Concern Galnaftogaz topped the ranking of the TOP-10 best managers in Ukraine according to the magazine Kompanion. According to FOCUS magazine, Antonov was among the hundred most influential Ukrainians in 2014.

In 2015, Antonov took 28th place in the Top 100 best managers of Ukraine from Delo.UA. Also, the rating experts recognized him as one of the 10 Ukrainian business leaders with the highest reputation.

In 2018, the traditional annual ranking of the best top managers of Ukraine by FOCUS magazine included Antonov in the TOP-3 in the retail segment. In the same year, according to the rating of Delo.UA, Antonov took the first place among the best CEOs according to experts and became the 38th in the general list of "300 best top managers of Ukraine". In September 2018, he was included in the list of the 100 most influential people in Ukraine according to Novoe Vremya magazine. In the ranking of innovation leaders, compiled by Leadership Journey together with the consulting company Nobles Fortune, the president of Concern Galnaftogaz Vitaliy Antonov took seventh place.

In 2019, Antonov entered the annual ranking of FOCUS magazine, becoming one of the best managers in Ukraine in the retail segment. According to readers of Novoe Vremya, Antonov entered the top 12 business columnists, whose columns in 2019 collected the most views. He took third place in the ranking with the column "40 billion USD goes past the economy of Ukraine. What to do with it."

In 2020, Antonov entered the annual ranking of FOCUS magazine, named as one of the best managers in Ukraine in the retail segment.

Scandals 
On November 1, 2018, Russian sanctions were imposed against 322 citizens of Ukraine, including Antonov.

On August 21, 2018, in the premises of the Lviv and Kyiv offices of PJSC Concern Galnaftogaz (OKKO filling station network), officers of the Security Service of Ukraine conducted searches with the seizure of documents and equipment. According to Antonov, he and his company are "accused of financing actions taken to overthrow the constitutional order and change Ukraine's state borders," including financing separatism in Eastern Ukraine. In addition, the SSU suspects the OKKO gas station network of operating in the Crimea.

On October 25, 2018, in connection with the lack of corpus delicti, criminal proceedings that had been opened in May, 2018, by the Security Service of Ukraine on the grounds of a criminal offense under Part 3 of Art. 110-2 of the Criminal code of Ukraine were closed by the decision of the prosecutor of the General prosecutor's office of Ukraine based on paragraph 2 of part 1 of Art. 284 of the Criminal Procedure Code of Ukraine.

Other activities 
Since 1999 Antonov has been the Honorary Consul of the Republic of Lithuania in Lviv and Lviv Oblast, and since 2007 - the Honorary General Consul of the Republic of Lithuania in Lviv.

In 1999–2000, Antonov headed the commission of the Ukrainian Union of Industrialists and Entrepreneurs's commission on issues of the fuel-energy sector of Ukraine.

He has been the head of the Taras Shevchenko Ukrainian-Lithuanian Fund in 2001-2021.

Antonov became one of the founders of the Lviv Business School of the Ukrainian Catholic University in 2008.

He was a member of the Council of Investors under the Cabinet of Ministers of Ukraine in 2009–2010.

In 2016, Antonov was elected a member of the supervisory board of Ivan Franko Lviv National University.

On August 24, 2019, for a significant personal contribution to the socio-economic development of the district by the decision of the Skole District Council Number 800 dated August 8, 2019, Antonov was awarded the title of "Honorary Citizen of the Skole District".

In 2019-2020 he headed the newly established Committee on Strategic Initiatives,Investment and Tax Policy from the Federation of Employers of Ukraine.

Awards 

 State Order of Ukraine “For Merit” III Degree
 Lithuanian Government Award – “Millennium Star of Lithuania” Order
 “Christ's Birth 2000” Order of the Ukrainian Orthodox Church of the Moscow Patriarchy
 Award from the Head of the Ukrainian Greek-Catholic Church
 The title "Honorary Citizen of Skole District"

Family status 
Antonov is divorced; he has two daughters (born in 1985 and 1993) and a son (born in 2003).

Lives in the сanton of Vaud, Switzerland.

References

External links 
 http://www.okko.ua
 http://www.galnaftogas.com/

1962 births
Living people
People from Stryi
Ukrainian businesspeople in the oil industry
Honorary consuls of Lithuania
Ternopil National Economic University alumni